The Rollo Davidson Prize is a prize awarded annually to early-career probabilists by the Rollo Davidson trustees. It is named after English mathematician Rollo Davidson (1944–1970).

Rollo Davidson Trust 
In 1970, Rollo Davidson, a Fellow-elect of Churchill College, Cambridge died on Piz Bernina, a mountain in Switzerland. In 1975, a trust fund was established at Churchill College in his memory, endowed initially through the publication in his honour of two volumes of papers, edited by E. F. Harding and D. G. Kendall.

The Rollo Davidson Trust has awarded an annual prize to young probabilists since 1976, and has organized occasional lectures in honour of Davidson. Since 2012 the Trust
has also awarded an annual Thomas Bond Sprague Prize.

List of recipients of the Rollo Davidson Prize 

 1976 – Brian D. Ripley
 1977 – Olav Kallenberg
 1978 – Zhen-ting Hou
 1979 – Frank Kelly
 1980 – David Aldous and Erik Jørgensen
 1981 – John C. Gittins
 1982 – Rouben V. Ambartzumian and Persi Diaconis
 1983 – Ed Perkins
 1984 – Martin Thomas Barlow and Chris Rogers
 1985 – Piet Groeneboom and Terence John Lyons
 1986 – Peter Hall and Jean-François Le Gall
 1987 – Yao-chi Yu, Jie-zhong Zou, and Andrew Carverhill
 1988 – Peter Baxendale, Imre Z. Ruzsa, and Gábor J. Székely
 1989 – Geoffrey Grimmett and Rémi Léandre
 1990 – Steven Evans
 1991 – Alain-Sol Sznitman
 1992 – Krzysztof Burdzy
 1993 – Gérard Ben Arous and Robin Pemantle
 1994 – Thomas Mountford and Laurent Saloff-Coste
 1995 – Philippe Biane and Yuval Peres
 1996 – Bruce Driver and Jean Bertoin
 1997 – James Norris and 
 1998 – Davar Khoshnevisan and Wendelin Werner
 1999 – Raphaël Cerf and Gareth Roberts
 2000 – Kurt Johansson and David Wilson
 2001 – Richard Kenyon
 2002 – Stanislav Smirnov and Balaji Prabhakar
 2003 – Alice Guionnet
 2004 – Alexander Holroyd and Itai Benjamini
 2005 – Olle Häggström and Neil O'Connell
 2006 – Scott Sheffield
 2007 – Remco van der Hofstad
 2008 – Brian Rider and Bálint Virág
 2009 – Grégory Miermont
 2010 – Sourav Chatterjee and Gady Kozma
 2011 – Christophe Garban and Gábor Pete
 2012 –  and Hugo Duminil-Copin
 2013 – Eyal Lubetzky and Allan Sly
 2014 – Paul Bourgade and Ivan Corwin
 2015 – Nicolas Curien and Jason Miller
 2016 – Omer Angel, Jean-Christophe Mourrat, and Hendrik Weber
 2017 – Jian Ding and Nike Sun
 2018 – Nicolas Perkowski
 2019 – Tom Hutchcroft and Vincent Tassion
 2020 – Roland Bauerschmidt and Ewain Gwynne
 2021 – Ioan Manolescu and Daniel Remenik
 2022 – Amol Aggarwal and Konstantin Tikhomirov

List of Rollo Davidson Lecturers 
 1996 Persi Diaconis
 2001 Wendelin Werner
 2010 Stanislav Smirnov
 2015 Yuval Peres

See also

 List of mathematics awards

References

Awards established in 1976
Mathematical awards and prizes of the University of Cambridge
Churchill College, Cambridge